Raj Kumar Saini (born 1 July 1953) is an Indian politician. He was the MP of Kurukshetra, Haryana. In 2014 he became a member of 16th Loksabha by defeating 2 times MP from Indian National Congress Naveen Jindal.

Personal life 
Rajkumar Saini was born on 1 July 1953 in Chhoti Rasur Village of Ambala district.

Political career 
His political career started at very young age. At the age of only 24, in 1977, he became the "Sarpanch" of his Gram Panchayat "Badi Rasor". He was elected 2 times for the same. Being on the post he encouraged the education for all.

In 1983, he became a member of Panchayat Committee, Narayangar, Ambala and discharged his responsibilities honestly.

In 1994, he became a member of District council, Ambala. By this time his business had touched a great height.

In 1996, he upgraded from the district level politics to the next level at the state level and became member of Haryana assembly legislator.

From 1997-1999, he took charge of the State Minister (Printing Stationery and Transportation) in the Haryana Government. The Minister of State for Transport, Saini launched a campaign to educate the drivers of trucks and buses, which was highly appreciated in then government.

In 2000, he was made Minister of State, Sports and Transport. While playing the state minister, he campaigned for the promotion of state level players and made so many stadiums to encourage them.

In May 2014, he was elected to 16th Lok Sabha from Kurukshetra, Haryana.

In September 2014, he was made a member of the Standing Committee on Industry and the Advisory Committee of the Ministry of Steel and Mining.

He fought 2019 Haryana assembly elections from Gohana and lost to Jagbir Singh Malik. 
Many people believe he lost the election only because of his hatred speeches towards a particular community.

References

External links

- Rajkumar Saini on Facebook

- Biography Profile at Lok Sabha, Parliament of India

Living people
India MPs 2014–2019
Lok Sabha members from Haryana
State cabinet ministers of Haryana
Bharatiya Janata Party politicians from Haryana
1953 births
People from Kurukshetra district
Haryana Vikas Party politicians